The Lynnwood Link extension is a planned Link light rail extension traveling north from Northgate to Lynnwood in Snohomish County, Washington, United States. The  light rail extension includes stations in Lynnwood, Mountlake Terrace, and Shoreline along Interstate 5. It will be served by the 1 Line and 2 Line when it opens in 2024. The project was funded by the Sound Transit 2 (ST2) package approved by voters in November 2008, and began construction in 2019. Ridership is expected to be 63,000 to 74,000 daily in 2035.

Route and stations

In April 2015, the final environmental impact statement for the extension was released, and a Record of Decision from the Federal Transit Administration was received in July 2015. The southern limit of the extension will be the Northgate Link station, connecting southward via the Northgate Link Extension to Seattle via the University District. The route will parallel Interstate 5, with stations at NE 145th St, NE 185th St, Mountlake Terrace Transit Center, and Lynnwood Transit Center. Accommodations will be in place at NE 130th St and 220th St SW to allow for future infill stations.

History

In August 2017, Sound Transit announced that the project would be delayed six months (from late 2023 to mid 2024) and would cost $500 million more than expected, bringing the final budget to $2.9 billion. The changes were due to rising costs associated with land acquisition, labor, and materials in the local market.

The project's groundbreaking ceremony was held on September 3, 2019, and included Governor Jay Inslee, U.S. Senators Patty Murray and Maria Cantwell, and U.S. Representatives Rick Larsen and Suzan DelBene. It is scheduled to be completed in 2024, but construction delays on the 2 Line will limit the number of available trains.

References

External links

Lynnwood Link Extension project page
Lynnwood Link Extension document archive

Link light rail
Proposed railway lines in Washington (state)
2024 in rail transport
1500 V DC railway electrification